This is a list of women writers who were born in Peru or whose writings are closely associated with that country.

A
María Jesús Alvarado Rivera (1878–1971), novelist, playwright, journalist, women's rights activist
Marie Arana (born 1949), Peruvian-American novelist, journalist

B
Monica Brown (author) (born 1969), children's book author, literature professor

C

Mercedes Cabello de Carbonera (1845–1909), novelist, essayist
Aurora Cáceres (1877–1958), novelist, essayist, travel writer, biographer
Clarinda (17th century), pen name of an anonymous poet, author of Discurso en loor de la poesía

F
Julia Ferrer (1925–1995), poet

G
Doris Gibson (1910–2008), journalist, magazine publisher
Teresa González de Fanning (1836–1918), essayist, journalist, feminist writer, women's rights activist
Juana Manuela Gorriti (1818–1892), Argentine-born Peruvian freedom fighter, novelist, short story writer, newspaper founder

L
Ana María Llona Málaga (born 1936), poet

M
María Emma Mannarelli (born 1954), feminist writer, historian, professor
Manuela Antonia Márquez García-Saavedra (1844–1890), writer, poet, composer pianist
Clorinda Matto de Turner (1852–1909), novelist, biographer, essayist, translator

N
María Nieves y Bustamante (1871–1947), novelist, short story writer

O
Scarlett O'Phelan Godoy (born 1951), historian and university professor

P
Angélica Palma (1878–1935), novelist, biographer, journalist

S 
 Isabel Sabogal (born 1958), novelist, poet, translator
 Claudia Salazar Jiménez (born 1976), writer, editor, academic

V
Gisela Valcárcel (born 1963), television host, actress, autobiographer, magazine publisher
Virginia Vargas (born 1945), sociologist
Blanca Varela (1926–2009), widely translated poet
Chalena Vásquez (1950–2016), ethnomusicologist

See also
List of Peruvian writers
List of women writers
List of Spanish-language authors

-
Peruvian
Writers, women
Writers